Anathallis aristulata is a species of orchid found in South America.

References 

aristulata
Plants described in 1859